The Radio King is a 1922 American adventure film serial directed by Robert F. Hill and released by the Universal Film Manufacturing Co. The ten chapters began with "A Cry for Help" released October 22, 1922. The film is now considered to be a lost film.

Cast
 Roy Stewart as Bradley Lane
 Louise Lorraine as Ruth Leyden
 Sidney Bracey as Marnee
 Albert J. Smith as Renally (credited as Al Smith)
 Clark Comstock as John Leyden
 Ernest Butterworth Jr. as Jim Lawton
 Fontaine La Rue as Doria
 Slim Whitaker as The Mystery Man
 Lew Meehan
 Marion Feducha (credited as Marion Faducha)
 Helen Broneau
 Joseph North
 D. Mitsoras (credited as D.J. Mitsoras)
 Laddie Earle
 Charles Force

See also
 List of film serials
 List of film serials by studio

References

External links

1922 films
1922 adventure films
American silent serial films
American black-and-white films
Universal Pictures film serials
Films directed by Robert F. Hill
Lost American films
American adventure films
1922 lost films
Lost adventure films
1920s American films
Silent adventure films